The Argungu Fishing Festival or  Argungu Dance Festival is an annual four-day festival in the state of Kebbi, and other northern states like Niger in the north-western part of Northern Nigeria. The region is made up of fertile river areas of (matanfada, mala with much irrigation and orchards (lambu in Hausa).  The majority of fishermen are followers of Islam and also predominantly farmers. Kanta Museum is the main historical centre in Argungu for visitors across the globe. People from around the world travel to Argungu just to witness the occasion. The main purpose of the Argungu fishing festival is for fishing and unity. The festival usually takes 4-days of cultural event

History
The festival began in the year 1934, as a mark of the end of the centuries-old hostility between the Sokoto Caliphate and the Kebbi Kingdom. This festival has brought huge progress to the development of the state as a whole. 

It is usually called a Fishing-Frenzy Festival. The festival is celebrated to mark the beginning of the fishing season in Argungu, a river-side town in Kebbi State. It is celebrated between February and March every year.

In 2005, the winning fish weighed 75kg, and needed four men to hoist it onto the scales. In 2006 the festival banned fishing due to safety concerns relating to the low water levels.
The importance of the festival to the economy has led the government to conserve fish stock by prohibiting the use of gill nets and cast nets.
The Zauro polder project, an irrigation scheme in the Rima River floodplain to the south of Argungu, has been criticized because the reservoir threatens to flood the traditional site of the festival.

Activities include:

 Craft showcases
 Canoe races
 Agricultural showcases
 Cultural activities
 Wrestling matches
 Musical performances
 A Grand Fishing conquest
 Swimming contest

Competition
On the final day of the festival, a competition is held in which thousands of men line up along the river and at the sound of a gunshot, all of them jump into the river and have an hour to catch the largest fish. The winner can take home as much as $7,500 US dollars. Competitors are only allowed to use traditional fishing tools and many prefer to catch fish entirely by hand (a practice also popular elsewhere and known as "noodling") to demonstrate their prowess.

Purpose. The festival has many purposes which include: fishing, promoting unity, fun, and entertainment.

2020 Argungu Fishing Festival 

In the 2020 Argungu Fishing Festival, the individual who caught the biggest fish weighing about 78 kilograms was awarded N10 million, two new cars and two Hajj seats, second position, and third positions were also awarded. Over 50,000 fishermen participated in the annual festival held in Kebbi State and the winners were graded based on the weight of the fish caught. The President of Nigeria, Muhammadu Buhari visited the 2020 Argungu Fishing Festival The festival in 2020 was the 60th edition after 10 years of being on hold according to the governor of the state Abubakar Bagudu.

See also
Festivals in Nigeria

References

External links
Festival website
BBC Gallery

Fishing tournaments
Kebbi State
Cultural festivals in Nigeria
1934 establishments in Nigeria
Recurring events established in 1934
Annual events in Nigeria
Fishing in Nigeria
Festivals established in 1934